Paul B. Wiegmann (Павел Борисович Вигман) is a Russian physicist. He is the Robert W. Reneker Distinguished Service Professor in the Department of Physics at the University of Chicago, James Franck Institute and Enrico Fermi Institute. He specializes in theoretical condensed matter physics. He made pioneering contributions to the field of quantum integrable systems. He found exact solutions of O(3) Non-linear Sigma Model, Wess–Zumino–Witten model (together with Alexander Polyakov), Anderson impurity model and Kondo model.

Notable Achievements and Scientific Recognition 

In 2003, Paul Wiegmann was elected a Fellow of the American Physical Society, the official citation  indicating that the recognition was  "For exact solutions of models of interacting electronic systems and quantum field theory, including the multi-channel Kondo problem and the Anderson model for magnetic impurities."

Awards and Distinguished Appointments 

Lady Davis Fellowship, 2000
Humboldt Research Award, Alexander von Humboldt Foundation, 2002 
Fellow of American Physical Society, 2003
Kramers Chair, Spinoza Institute, 2003
Blaise Pascal Chair, Ile de France, 2006
Lars Onsager Prize, 2017

Publications 

According to the Inspire High-Energy Physics  database, Paul Wiegmann's author profile includes more than 2700 citations, several very well-known papers, and famous papers, and over 45 citations per article.

References

External links 
Paul Wiegmann on arXiv.org

Living people
Russian physicists
21st-century American physicists
University of Chicago faculty
1952 births